Roger Ruud (born 1 October 1958) is a Norwegian former ski jumper.

Career
He won the 1982 New Year's competition in Garmisch-Partenkirchen and finished second overall in the Four Hills Tournament that same year. He won the Holmenkollen ski jump competition in 1981.

Ruud was Norwegian champion in the large hill (1981) and twice in the normal hill (1982 and 1986). He was also Norwegian junior champion from 1975 to 1978. He also won three Norwegian Championships in Road racing.

Ruud finished 6th in the large hill and 13th in the normal hill at the 1980 Winter Olympics in Lake Placid, New York. He had nine additional World Cup career victories from 1980 to 1985.

In 2009, he has spent 30 days in prison for speeding.

World Cup

Standings

Wins

References

External links

Holmenkollen winners since 1892 - click Vinnere for downloadable pdf file 

1958 births
Living people
Norwegian male ski jumpers
Holmenkollen Ski Festival winners
Ski jumpers at the 1980 Winter Olympics
Olympic ski jumpers of Norway
Norwegian prisoners and detainees
Prisoners and detainees of Norway
People from Hurdal
Sportspeople from Viken (county)